Kilmory Castle (Kilmorie Castle, Crowner's Castle) is the remains of a 15th-century castle at Meikle Kilmory, Isle of Bute, Scotland. The castle was the residence of the Jamiesons of Kilmorie, and was already a ruin in the 18th century. The Jamiesons of Kilmorie were the hereditary coroners of Bute. The ruins are a secular listed building.

References

Category B listed buildings in Argyll and Bute
Isle of Bute
Ruined castles in Argyll and Bute
Scheduled Ancient Monuments in Argyll and Bute